Merlet is a hotel and restaurant in Schoorl, Netherlands. It was awarded a Michelin star in 1998, and has held it since.

GaultMillau awarded them 15.0 points (out of 20). It was named of Dutch restaurant of the year 2012 by restaurant guide Grootspraak.

Merlet is member of Alliance Gastronomique Néerlandaise.

Head chef Alan Pearson was the first Merlet chef to be awarded a Michelin star. In 2001 he was succeeded by Wilco Berends, who in turn was succeeded by Timo Munts in 2007. Both managed to retain the star. 
In October 2012, it was announced that chef Munts would leave the restaurant on 1 January 2013. He was succeeded by former sous-chef Frank van Enter. Jonathan Zandbergen became the new executive chef in 2015.

References

External links
 Official website

Restaurants in the Netherlands